Vege River (Swedish: Vege å)  is a river in Sweden.

References

Rivers of Skåne County